The Montreal Junior Canadiens were a junior ice hockey team in the Quebec Junior Hockey League from 1933 to 1961, and the Ontario Hockey Association from 1961 to 1972. They played out of the Montreal Forum in Montreal, Quebec, Canada.

History
The Junior Canadiens were a farm team to the NHL Montreal Canadiens from the early 1930s until the institution of the NHL Entry Draft. The Juniors originally played in the Quebec Junior Hockey League.

In 1961 the franchise switched to the Ontario Hockey Association to compete at the major junior level. It was granted entry as an expansion club in 1961. At the time, major hockey in Quebec, and the Quebec Major Junior Hockey League, did not exist.

1950
In the Quebec Junior playoffs, the Junior Canadiens defeated the Quebec Citadels and the Halifax St. Marys. The series versus Halifax was surrendered by St. Marys when Montreal won the first two games on the road by scores of 11–3 and 10–1. After that the Junior Canadiens defeated the Guelph Biltmore Mad Hatters to represent eastern Canada in the Memorial Cup.

The Memorial Cup of 1950 saw two farm teams of the Montreal Canadiens playing each other for the top junior prize. The Junior Canadiens defeated the Regina Pats in a best-of-seven game series by 4 games to 1, winning on home ice at the Forum.

Moving to Ottawa, Brockville, and Hull
In 1955, the Quebec Junior Hockey League disbanded. With the Canadiens as the sole-survivor of the league, they elected to play an independent schedule but still compete in the Laurier Cup seasonal tournament with the teams of the OHA. The Canadiens would win the Laurier Cup that year, outplaying the best of the OHA. The Canadiens entered the Richardson Trophy playdowns as an independent team, but lost in the finals to the OHA's Toronto Marlboros 4-games-to-3 with 1 tie.

In 1956, their parent team moved them to the Capital Region under the name Ottawa-Hull Canadiens. The Jr. Habs would play a series of games against the OHA, the Quebec Hockey League, and the OHA Senior A League to prepare for the playoffs. The Canadiens finished second in the Laurier Cup to the Toronto Marlboros. The Canadiens would have a great season, win the George Richardson Memorial Trophy as Eastern Canadian Junior A champions, but lose the 1957 Memorial Cup in seven games to the Flin Flon Bombers.

In 1957, the Canadiens would win the Laurier Cup for the second time of its four-year existence and again win the Richardson Trophy again. This time around, the Canadiens would win the 1958 Memorial Cup by defeating the Regina Pats in five games.

In 1958, the Canadiens dropped their series with the OHA as the Laurier Cup was abolished. They joined the OHA Senior A League as a full member instead. With a mixed Senior/Junior roster, the Canadiens would finish third in the OHA Senior League's Eastern League and lose the Eastern League's semi-final to the Kingston Merchants 4-games-to-3 with 1 tie. The junior portion of the squad moved on to the Richardson Trophy playdowns, where it lost the final to Peterborough Petes.

In 1959, the Eastern Professional Hockey League formed the Hull-Ottawa Canadiens in the region, another Montreal NHL affiliate. To avoid conflict with the new club, the Jr. Habs were moved to become the Brockville Canadiens and joined the Metropolitan Montreal Junior Hockey League. Their players still maintained affiliation with the Pro Canadiens and often played for both teams. The Canadiens dominated their new league with a 25-1-0 record and participated in the Quebec Junior championships instead of the league's playoffs. The Canadiens would be named 1960 Quebec Junior Champions by crushing the Alma Aiglons 11-1 and 10-0 before the Aiglons conceded the third game. The Canadiens would make it all the way to the Richardson Trophy final before finally losing out. In the final, they faced the OHA's St. Catharines Teepees. The Teepees would win the first three games of the series, but the Canadiens would battle back to tie the series at 3-games-to-3 with 1 tie. The Teepees would win the decisive Game 8 6-3 to clinch the series.

In 1960, the franchise relocated to become the Hull Canadiens. Despite having junior players on their roster, the team joined the more competitive Interprovincial Senior Hockey League. They would be 1960-61 regular season (losing only twice) and 1961 playoff champions of the ISHL with a sweep of the Smiths Falls Rideaus and defeating Ottawa St. Anthonys 3-games-to-1. The Canadiens represented the Ottawa District in 1961 Allan Cup playdowns but were swept by the Quebec champion Granby Victorias.

A prominent player in this independent era was Jacques Laperrière. After playing his first junior year with the St-Laurent Jets of the MMJHL in 1957-58, the next season he signed with the Ottawa-Hull Canadiens in the Eastern League of the OHA Senior Loop and played as both a junior and senior member of the split squad. In 1959-60, he continued with the Brockville Canadiens as they found a home in the MMJHL, but split his time called up with the EPHL Canadiens. The next season as a junior player on the Hull Canadiens in Interprovincial Senior he was again up as a call-up in the EPHL with the Semi-Pro Canadiens. In 1961-62, he moved with the Jr. Canadiens back to Montreal as they joined the OHA but still came up for a single EPHL game. In 1962-63, he turned full pro and signed directly with the EPHL Canadiens. By the end of the season he was in the NHL with the Habs and stayed there until he retired in 1974.

In the Summer of 1961, the parent club was successful on getting the club into the OHA and brought them back to Montreal permanently.

1957
In the 1957 season with the minor pro Quebec Hockey League, Ottawa put together a record of 7 wins, 12 losses, and a tie, with 57 goals for and 74 goals against. The Canadiens, on average, were about 5–8 years younger than their opponents and held up well.

Ottawa won the right to play for the Cup by defeating the Guelph Biltmore Mad Hatters to win the George Richardson Memorial Trophy as Eastern Canadian representatives.

The Junior Canadiens were runners-up to the Memorial Cup in 1957. They were defeated by the Flin Flon Bombers 4 games to 3 in a best-of-seven series.

1958
In 1958 the team was known from that year on as the Hull-Ottawa Canadiens, not to be confused with the senior team of a similar name. The Junior Canadiens defeated the Toronto Marlboros to win their second consecutive Richardson Trophy.

Hull-Ottawa's opponent for the Memorial Cup would be another farm team of NHL Montreal team, the Regina Pats.

1961 league change
In the summer of 1961, the Ontario Hockey Association Junior-A League was reduced to five teams, when several teams split away to form the Metro Junior A League. In August, Ontario Hockey Association president Lloyd Pollock applied to the Canadian Amateur Hockey Association (CAHA) to permit the Canadiens to switch from the Quebec Amateur Hockey Association to play in the OHA as its sixth team. The request was denied by CAHA president Jack Roxburgh, who stated that CAHA rules do not allow en masse transfers between provincial associations. The proposal for the Canadiens to play in the OHA's junior division was later approved in September 1961, when the CAHA branch presidents voted in its favour.

1969
This team is considered by many to be the greatest junior hockey team of all time. The Junior Canadiens beat out the St. Catharines Black Hawks for the OHA Championship, then bettered the Sorel Black Hawks (Éperviers) 3 games to 1 for the Richardson Cup. The Montreal roster that year featured 13 rookies. The Canadiens would pick up netminder Jim Rutherford from the Hamilton Red Wings for the national championship.

The Memorial Cup of 1969 would be a rematch of 19 years earlier, with the Regina Pats. The first two games were scheduled for the Montreal Forum, with the remainder of the games to be played in Regina's Exhibition Stadium. The Junior Canadiens swept the Regina Pats in a very physical series.

The team included many future NHL stars and all-stars: Gilbert Perreault, Rick Martin, Marc Tardif, Rejean Houle, Ian Turnbull, Andre Dupont, Guy Charron, J.P. Bordeleau, Bobby Lalonde and Jocelyn Guevremont.

1970
The 1970 Junior Canadiens finished 1st in the OHA then defeated the Ottawa 67's and St. Catharines Black Hawks to reach the finals versus the Toronto Marlboros. The Junior Canadiens triumphed for the J. Ross Robertson Cup then played the NOHA champion Sault Ste. Marie Greyhounds.

Montreal won the first game 6–2, but the "Soo" won game two 5–4. It was the first time in history that a team from the NOHA beat an OHA team in the playoffs. Montreal quickly responded winning the next three games 10–1, 9–2 and 20–1.

For the Richardson Cup the Canadiens would play the Quebec Junior Hockey League champions Quebec Remparts. The Remparts featured Guy Lafleur. The Canadiens prevailed in a 3-game sweep in front of crowds numbering over 14,000 in Quebec City, and over 18,000 in Montreal.

Their opponents for the Memorial Cup of 1970 would be the Weyburn Red Wings of the Saskatchewan Junior Hockey League. Coached by Stan Dunn the Red Wings were a very tough forechecking squad. The games became closer as the series progressed, but the Junior Canadiens swept the series, winning on home ice at the Forum.

Move to QMJHL
In 1972 the Quebec Major Junior Hockey League had been in operation for three years, giving the province major junior competition for the first time. The Q obviously wanted a team in the province's largest city, and was threatening a lawsuit to force the Junior Canadiens back into the Quebec-based league. Over the summer of 1972 the OHA granted the Junior Habs a "one-year suspension" of operations, while team ownership transferred the team and players into the QMJHL, renaming themselves the Montreal Bleu Blanc Rouge in the process. The OHA then reactivated the suspended franchise for the 1973–74 season in Kingston, Ontario, under new ownership and with new players, calling the team the Kingston Canadians. The new Kingston team had little connection with the old Junior Canadiens, but in some OHA histories (such as the annual Media Guide) the Kingston team is still shown as the legitimate successors of the Junior Canadiens' legacy.

Championships

Memorial CupNational championship.
 1950 Champions vs. Regina Pats
 1957 Lost to Flin Flon Bombers
 1958 Champions vs. Regina Pats
 1969 Champions vs. Regina Pats
 1970 Champions vs. Weyburn Red Wings

George Richardson Memorial TrophyEastern Canadian championship.
 1943 Lost to Oshawa Generals
 1946 Lost to Toronto St. Michael's Majors
 1947 Lost to Toronto St. Michael's Majors 
 1950 Champions vs. Guelph Biltmore Mad Hatters
 1952 Lost to Guelph Biltmore Mad Hatters
 1956 Lost to Toronto Marlboros
 1957 Champions vs. Guelph Biltmores
 1958 Champions vs. Toronto Marlboros
 1959 Lost to Peterborough Petes
 1960 Lost to St. Catharines Teepees
 1969 Champions vs. Sorel Éperviers (Black Hawks)
 1970 Champions vs. Quebec Remparts

J. Ross Robertson CupOntario Hockey Association championship.
 1964 Lost to Toronto Marlboros
 1969 Champions vs. St. Catharines Black Hawks
 1970 Champions vs. Toronto Marlboros

Hamilton Spectator TrophyFirst overall in the OHA regular season standings.
 1961–1962 73 points (34 wins, 5 ties)
 1968–1969 80 points (37 wins, 6 ties)
 1969–1970 79 points (37 wins, 5 ties)

Coaches
Sam Pollock and Billy Reay coached the 1950 Memorial Cup champions Jr. Canadiens. Elmer Lach coached the 1954–55 squad. Claude Ruel coached the team its first two years in the OHA, he would later win the Stanley Cup with the Montreal Canadiens in 1969. Former goaltender Yves Nadon piloted the team to its first OHA finals in 1964. Roger Bedard led the team to successive Memorial Cup wins in 1969 & 1970.

Players

O.H.A. awards

Red Tilson TrophyOHL Most valuable player.
1963–1964 Yvan Cournoyer 
1968–1969 Rejean Houle
1969–1970 Gilbert Perreault

Eddie Powers Memorial TrophyOHL Top Point Scorer.
1961–1962 Andre Boudrias 
1963–1964 Andre Boudrias
1968–1969 Rejean Houle

Max Kaminsky TrophyMost Outstanding Defenceman.
1970–1971 Jocelyn Guevremont

Dave Pinkney TrophyLowest team goals against average.
1961–1962 George Holmes
1965–1966 Ted Ouimet
1968–1969 Wayne Wood and Ted Tucker

William Hanley TrophyMost sportsmanlike player.
1968–1969 Rejean Houle

Hall of Fame alumni
QJHL (1933–1961)

OHA (1961–1972)

NHL alumni
QJHL (1933–1956)

  
Independent alumni (Ottawa-Hull, Brockville, Hull) (1956–1959)

OHA (1961–1972)

Yearly results

Regular season

Playoffs
1933-34 Lost to Montreal Jr. Royals 5 goals to 4 in JAHA finals.
1934-35 Lost to Verdun Maple Leafs 5-4 in JAHA fourth place tie-breaker.
1935-36 Out of playoffs.
1936-37 Lost to Montreal Jr. Royals 14 goals to 13 in JAHA semi-finals.
1940-41 Defeated Verdun Maple Leafs 11 goales to 2 in JAHA semi-finals.Lost to Montreal Jr. Royals 2 games to 0 in JAHA finals.
1941-42 Defeated Montreal Concordia Civics 16 goals to 11 in JAHA semi-finals.Lost to Montreal Jr. Royals 2 games to 0 in JAHA finals.
1942-43 Defeated Verdun Maple Leafs 3 games to 0 in JAHA semi-finals.Defeated Montreal Jr. Royals 3 games to 1 in JAHA finals. JAHA CHAMPIONSDefeated Valleyfield Canadiens 15 goals to 0 in QAHA semi-final.Defeated Town of Mount Royals 6 goals to 1 in QAHA finals. QAHA CHAMPIONSDefeated Sydney Bruins 2 games to 0 in Richardson Trophy semi-finals.Lost to Oshawa Generals 3 games to 0 in Richardson Trophy finals.
1943-44 Lost to Montreal Concordia Civics 2 games 1 in JAHA semi-finals.
1944-45 Defeated Verdun Terriers 2 games to 0 in JAHA semi-finals.Lost to Montreal Jr. Royals 4 games to 0 in JAHA finals.
1945-46 Defeated Montreal Nationale 2 games to 0 with 2 ties in JAHA semi-finals.Defeated Montreal Concordia Civics 2 games to 1 in JAHA finals. JAHA CHAMPIONSDefeated Ottawa St. Patricks 2 games to 0 in Richardson Trophy semi-finals.Lost to St. Michael's Majors 3 games to 0 in Richardson Trophy finals.
1946-47 Defeated Lachine Rapides 4 games to 0 in JAHA semi-finals.Defeated Montreal Nationale 3 games to 1 in JAHA finals. JAHA CHAMPIONSDefeated Halifax St. Marys 3 games to 0 in Richardson Trophy quarter-finals.Defeated Inkerman Rockets 2 games to 0 in Richardson Trophy semi-finals.Lost to St. Michael's Majors 3 games to 0 in Richardson Trophy finals.
1947-48 Lost to Quebec Citadelles 3 games to 2 in JAHA quarter-finals.
1948-49 Lost to Trois-Rivieres Reds 3 games to 1 in JAHA quarter-finals.
1949-50 Defeated Trois-Rivieres Reds 5 games to 4 in QJHL semi-finals.Defeated Quebec Citadelles 4 games to 2 with 1 tie in QJHL finals. QJHL CHAMPIONSDefeated Halifax St. Marys 2 games to 0 and a concession in Richardson Trophy semi-finals.Defeated Guelph Biltmores 4 games to 2 in Richardson Trophy finals. Richardson Trophy winnersDefeated Regina Pats 4 games to 1 in Memorial Cup finals. MEMORIAL CUP CHAMPIONS
1961–62 Lost to Niagara Falls Flyers 8 points to 4 in OHA semi-finals.
1962–63 Defeated Peterborough Petes 9 points to 3 in OHA semi-finals. Lost to Niagara Falls Flyers 8 points to 0 in OHA finals.
1963–64 Defeated Peterborough Petes 8 points to 2 in quarter-finals. Defeated St. Catharines Black Hawks 9 points to 5 in semi-finals.  Lost to Toronto Marlboros 9 points to 1 in finals.
1964–65 Lost to Toronto Marlboros 9 points to 7 in quarter-finals.
1965–66 Defeated Hamilton Red Wings 8 points to 0 in quarter-finals. Lost to Oshawa Generals 8 points to 2 in semi-finals.
1966–67 Lost to Toronto Marlboros 8 points to 4 in quarter-finals.
1967–68 Defeated St. Catharines Black Hawks 9 points to 1 in quarter-finals. Lost to Niagara Falls Flyers 8 points to 4 in semi-finals.
1968–69 Defeated Hamilton Red Wings 8 points to 0 in quarter-finals. Defeated Peterborough Petes 8 points to 0 in semi-finals. Defeated St. Catharines Black Hawks 9 points to 1 in finals. OHA CHAMPIONS Defeated Sudbury Wolves of Northern Ontario Hockey Association. Defeated Sorel Éperviers 3 games to 1 in Eastern Canada final Richardson Trophy winnersDefeated Regina Pats in Memorial Cup finals. MEMORIAL CUP CHAMPIONS
1969–70 Defeated Ottawa 67's 8 points to 2 in quarter-finals. Defeated St. Catharines Black Hawks 8 points to 0 in semi-finals. Defeated Toronto Marlboros 8 points to 6 in finals. OHA CHAMPIONS Defeated Sault Ste. Marie Greyhounds of Northern Ontario Hockey Association 4 games to 1. Defeated Québec Remparts 3 games to 0 in Eastern Canada final Richardson Trophy winners Defeated Weyburn Red Wings in Memorial Cup finals. MEMORIAL CUP CHAMPIONS
1970–71 Defeated London Knights 8 points to 0 in quarter-finals. Lost to St. Catharines Black Hawks 9 points to 5 in semi-finals.
1971–72 Out of playoffs.

Arena
The Junior Canadiens played at the Montreal Forum, on the same ice as the NHL team. The Montreal Forum also hosted Memorial Cup games in 1950, 1968, 1969, 1970, 1973 & 1976, with the Junior Canadiens winning on home ice in 1950 & 1970.

References

1933 establishments in Quebec
1972 disestablishments in Quebec
Defunct Ontario Hockey League teams
Defunct Quebec Major Junior Hockey League teams
Jun
Ice hockey clubs established in 1933
Ice hockey clubs disestablished in 1972